Francis Preston Blair Jr. (February 19, 1821 – July 8, 1875) was a United States Senator, a United States Congressman and a Union Major General during the Civil War. He represented Missouri in both the House of Representatives and the Senate, and was active in preventing the State of Missouri from being absorbed into the Confederacy at the beginning of the Civil War.

Blair was instrumental in appointing Nathaniel Lyon as the new military commander of the Western Department of the U.S. Army. He assisted Lyon in securing help of the St. Louis Home Guard in moving over 20,000 rifles and muskets from the St. Louis Arsenal to Illinois. Missouri secessionists considered this event as breaking of informal truce established in the state. This set the scene for the Camp Jackson Affair and continuing guerrilla activity by outraged pro-slavery elements. In 1862, Blair joined the Missouri volunteers, being promoted major general, commanded a division at Vicksburg under Sherman, took part in Sherman's March to the Sea and ended the war as a corps commander.

In 1868, he was Horatio Seymour's vice-presidential candidate, but his dramatic speeches about the dangers of black emancipation were believed by some to have cost the Democrats the election. Blair suffered a paralyzing stroke in 1872, but continued to be active in state politics until his death three years later.

Early life and career
Blair was born in Lexington, Kentucky. He was the third and youngest son of newspaper editor and politician Francis Preston Blair, and Eliza Violet (Gist) Blair. He was the brother of Montgomery Blair, a Mayor of St. Louis and Postmaster General under Lincoln, and the cousin of B. Gratz Brown, a U.S. Senator and Governor of Missouri. Blair attended schools in Washington, D.C., was matriculated in Yale and the University of North Carolina, but graduated from Princeton University in 1841, and then studied law at Transylvania University. After his admission to the Kentucky bar in Lexington, he went on to practice in St. Louis in 1842 with his elder brother; in 1842–1845, he worked in the law office of Thomas Hart Benton.

Mexican–American War
In fall 1845, Blair traveled to the West for buffalo hunt and stayed for a winter in eastern Colorado with his cousin George Bent in Bent's Fort, a settlement on the Santa Fe Trail. After the Mexican–American War started he joined the expedition of General Stephen W. Kearny in Santa Fe, who then appointed  Blair as an attorney general for the New Mexico Territory after it was secured. In collaboration with Alexander William Doniphan, Willard Preble Hall, and David Waldo, Blair developed an American Code of Law for the region and became a judge of the newly established circuit court.

In the political arena
Being more interested in politics than law, Blair came back to St. Louis in the summer of 1847. A personal and political friend of Thomas Hart Benton, he became known for his views opposing slavery and strong advocacy of free soil politics, though he was a slaveholder himself. Blair served in the Missouri House of Representatives from 1852 to 1856. He was an outspoken Free-Soiler and was elected as a Republican to the United States House of Representatives in 1856. On January 14, 1858, he delivered a major speech describing slavery as a national problem, proposing to solve it by both gradual emancipation and the settling of freed slaves in South and Central America. A year later in Boston, he gained national prominence with his speech, The Destiny of the Races of This Continent.

Towards the end of his first term, Blair was defeated in his bid for re-election in 1858 by John R. Barret. He went on to successfully contest the results and was finally seated in the 36th Congress on June 8, 1860. However, he resigned just seventeen days later on June 25, then lost his bid in the subsequent special election, the seat instead being refilled by Barret on December 3. In the regular election of 1860, he was subsequently re-elected to the 37th Congress, serving in it as chairman of the important Military Affairs Committee. He again resigned in July 1861 in order to become a colonel in the Union Army. In 1862, he won election to the 38th Congress but in a reversal of fortune was himself forced to relinquish his seat on June 10, 1864 after his opponent, Samuel Knox, successfully contested the results.

The Blairs were unwavering supporters of Abraham Lincoln during his rise to the presidency and years in office and in return enjoyed his political patronage. In December 1863, Lincoln said, "The Blairs have to an unusual degree the spirit of clan. Their family is a close corporation. Frank is their hope and pride. They have a way of going with a rush for anything they undertake, especially have Montgomery and the Old Gentleman."

In the days following Lincoln's election as president, when it became evident that several Southern states were advocating secession, Blair was among the leaders of a new political movement in Missouri, the Unconditional Union Party, which advocated the use of its paramilitary Home Guard, if necessary, to prevent Missouri from seceding.

Civil War

Immediately after South Carolina's secession in December 1860, Blair, believing that the southern leaders were planning to carry Missouri into the movement, began active efforts to prevent it. He personally organized and equipped a force of several thousand strong Home Guard, drawn from the Wide Awakes, the Republican marching clubs of the 1860 presidential campaign, and the members of the German gymnastic movement in St. Louis, Turnverein. When tensions rose, Blair and Captain (later brigadier general) Nathaniel Lyon suddenly transferred the arms in the U.S. Arsenal at St. Louis to Alton, Illinois. On May 10, 1861, Lyon, with the Home Guards and a U.S. regular Army company, captured several hundred secessionist state militia which had been positioned to seize the Arsenal. The Camp Jackson Affair gave the Federal cause a decisive initial advantage in Missouri but also inflamed secessionist sentiments in the state.

Open warfare between Union forces and the followers of pro-Southern Missouri governor Claiborne Jackson was imminent. To avoid this, General William S. Harney, the Army commander in Missouri, agreed to the Price-Harney Truce with Missouri State Guard commander Sterling Price on May 21.

Blair objected, and contacted Republican leaders in Washington. Within a few weeks, Harney was replaced by Lyon as temporary commander. Lyon drove Jackson and Price to the southwestern corner of Missouri before he was killed at the Battle of Wilson's Creek, while Blair helped organize a new all-Unionist state government, and John C. Frémont took over as the U.S. Army Western Department commander.

Frémont was himself a prominent Republican with Missouri connections. Blair soon came to regard Frémont as a political rival, and they clashed over many aspects of Frémont's operations in Missouri. Frémont as the regional Army commander was responsible for spending a lot of money in a great hurry for supplies and equipment. Blair expected most of this money to go his allies in the St. Louis business community, but Frémont and his staff had their own ideas. Blair's bitter complaints, added to the waste and corruption, helped discredit Frémont, who was replaced on November 2.

Blair was appointed a colonel of Missouri volunteers in July 1862. He was promoted brigadier general of volunteers in August 1862 and then to major general in November. After winning re-election to the House of Representatives, Blair resigned his commission, but he retracted it at a request/order from Lincoln dated in April 1864. In response to this, "the Senate passed a resolution that, thereafter, no officers whose resignations had been duly accepted should be restored to the service without a new appointment and confirmation by the Senate."  

In Missouri, Blair commanded a brigade consisting of the 13th Illinois Infantry, the 29th, 30th, 31st, and 32nd Missouri Infantry, the 58th Ohio Infantry, 4th Company, Ohio Light Artillery, and Company C, 10th Missouri Cavalry.

Blair subsequently  commanded a division in the Vicksburg campaign and in the fighting about Chattanooga, and was one of William T. Sherman's corps commanders in the final campaigns in Georgia and the Carolinas. His XVII Corps was engaged protecting the rear areas of Sherman's army until later in the Atlanta Campaign. Before it left on the March to the Sea, XVII Corps absorbed part of the detachment of XVI Corps that had served with Sherman.

Postbellum activities
At the close of the war, Blair, having spent much of his private fortune in support of the Union, was financially ruined. In 1866, like his father and brother he opposed the Congressional Reconstruction policy, and on that issue left the Republican Party.

In 1866 he ran for a seat on the Missouri General Assembly against Charles Branscomb. The election was contested, but in the end, Blair was defeated after the Missouri Attorney General Robert Franklin Wingate ruled that votes cast after sundown were valid.

In 1868, he was the unsuccessful Democratic candidate for vice president, running with Horatio Seymour. Blair contributed to the Democratic defeat by going on a speaking tour in which he framed the contest with Ulysses S. Grant and the pro-Reconstruction Republicans in stark racial terms, warning of the rule of "a semi-barbarous race of blacks who are worshipers of fetishes and poligamists" and wanted to "subject the white women to their unbridled lust." At least one Democratic Congressman saw Blair as the cause of Seymour's defeat, calling his behavior "stupid and indefensible."

Blair had an odd minor notoriety, when on July 29, 1870, he was an accidental witness to an incident in a famous homicide case. Staying at the then famous Fifth Avenue Hotel, facing West 23rd Street off Fifth Avenue, Blair woke up to cries of help from across the street. He watched from his hotel window as two men ran out of a brownstone mansion across the street. They were two of the sons of Benjamin Nathan, the Vice President of the New York Stock Exchange.  Benjamin Nathan was found in the mansion, bludgeoned to death. There was a series of hearings, and even suspicion towards several people, but the mystery was never solved.

In 1871 Blair was chosen by the Missouri Legislature as a United States Senator. On November 16, 1872, he was stricken with paralysis, from which he never recovered. Largely owing to his stricken condition, he was defeated for reelection to the Senate in January 1873. Blair learned to write painfully with his left hand and continued his political efforts.

Blair's consuming interest in politics kept him active and he served as Missouri's state superintendent of insurance until his death from head injuries after a fall on July 8, 1875 at the age of 54. He is interred in Bellefontaine Cemetery.

Family
In 1847, Blair married Appoline Alexander; they had eight children.

Recognition
William T. Sherman after hearing about Blair's death said, "I always regarded him as one of the truest patriots, most honest and honorable men, and one of the most courageous soldiers this country ever produced." Ulysses S. Grant wrote about Frank Blair in his memoir that, "There was no man braver than he, nor was there any who obeyed all orders of his superior in rank with more unquestioning alacrity. He was one man as a soldier, another as a politician."

In 1885, a statue to Senator Blair was erected at the entrance to Forest Park in St. Louis at the intersection of Kingshighway and Lindell Blvds.

In 1899, the state of Missouri donated a marble statue of Blair by Alexander Doyle to the U.S. Capitol's National Statuary Hall Collection.

See also

 List of American Civil War generals (Union)
 1st Missouri, US Reserve Corps Infantry (3 months, 1861)

References

Further reading
 Smith, Elbert B. Francis Preston Blair (1980) online

 Smith, William Ernest. The Francis Preston Blair Family in Politics (2 Vol Macmillan, 1933) online.

External links
Blair family papers from Princeton University Library. Special Collections
Apolline Alexander Blair, Wife Of Union General And Senator Francis P. Blair, Jr.

 Retrieved on 2008-02-12
 
 Blair in Statuary Hall at the U.S. Capitol
 

|-

|-

|-

|-

|-

1821 births
1875 deaths
People from Lexington, Kentucky
American people of Scotch-Irish descent
Missouri Free Soilers
Republican Party members of the United States House of Representatives from Missouri
Missouri Unconditional Unionists
Democratic Party United States senators from Missouri
1868 United States vice-presidential candidates
Democratic Party (United States) vice presidential nominees
New Mexico Attorneys General
Members of the Missouri House of Representatives
Transylvania University alumni
American people of the Mexican–American War
American military personnel of the Mexican–American War
Southern Unionists in the American Civil War
People of Missouri in the American Civil War
Union Army generals
Burials at Bellefontaine Cemetery
Members of the United States House of Representatives removed by contest
Missouri Democrats
American slave owners
Blair family